La que no podía amar (The One Who Couldn't Love) is a Mexican telenovela produced by José Alberto Castro for Televisa and aired on Canal de las Estrellas from August 1, 2011 to March 18, 2012. Ximena Suárez wrote the script based on the original story by Delia Fiallo. The cast was headed by Jorge Salinas, José Ron and Ana Brenda Contreras. La que no podía amar won 2 awards in Premios TVyNovelas, for Best Lead Actor, and Best Supporting Actor. In the United States the telenovela aired on Univision from January 2, 2012 to August 10, 2012.

Plot
Ana Paula lives in Chiapas where she is studying nursing; her devotion for sick people came up while she took care of her ill Aunt throughout her long agony. When she was about to graduate, she met Bruno, Rogelio Montero's lawyer. Bruno offered her a job nursing his boss who became paralytic and got stuck in a wheel chair after having an accident. The pay is good so she takes the job in order to financially support her aunt Rosaura, who has been like a mother to her and her brother Miguel ever since they were kids.

Ana Paula arrives in "La Hacienda Del Fuerte” to look after Rogelio and she is surprised to learn that he is a bitter, resentful man mostly because Vanessa, his shallow former fiancée, left him after the accident.

In the hacienda also lives Cynthia, Rogelio's sister, who is in fact kept there by her brother since he forced her to stay and take care of him in exchange for keeping the lifestyle she is used to have. To avoid boredom, she began an affair with Efraín, the Hacienda's foreman; he actually falls in love with her, but she is only using him for fun. With them also lives their nanny, María, who has always acted as a loving mother to Rogelio and Cynthia, and who is not able to ever leave them.

Rogelio's arrogance and bad mood make it very difficult for Ana Paula to work with him, so one day she decides to quit. She has an accident in the river and she is rescued by Gustavo Durán, a handsome and good hearted engineer. They fall in love but their plans are frustrated when Gustavo has an accident. Gustavo's father, who is also named Gustavo, dies. And Ana Paula believes Gustavo, her boyfriend is dead instead of Gustavo's father.

Rogelio has also fallen in love with Ana Paula. He sends Bruno to look for her and ask her to come back to the hacienda as his nurse and offers triple the pay. At first she refuses, but afterwards, when Miguel is blamed for crashing a truck in which he loses three of his right hand's fingers and two pedestrians are injured and later die, it could send him to jail for life. Rogelio offers to help pay all the surgery and medical bills as well as the legal fees, which amounts to two million pesos, if Ana Paula agrees to his marriage proposal. She accepts to make the sacrifice in order to help her brother, so she marries Rogelio and signs a prenuptial contract for one-year marriage with the promise that Rogelio helps Ana Paula's family and in return she keeps him company and be the señora Montero.

Gustavo comes back looking for Ana Paula but Rosaura, considering the marriage of her niece with Rogelio as the solution to all her financial problems, decides to lie to Gustavo, telling him that Ana Paula is not interested in him anymore. Gustavo feels disappointed and decides to forget her.

After returning to the Hacienda, the life of Ana Paula as Rogelio's wife is a living hell, one she had never imagined. She will have to deal with Cynthia's humiliations and envy; she will also have to manage her brother's problems, as well as Bruno and Rosaura's greed. Although, as time passes and Rogelio's cold and harsh demeanor began to change so do Ana Paula's feelings for Rogelio. And on top of that, she will meet again with Gustavo, the love of her life, knowing that perhaps, he may never be for her...

Cast

 Jorge Salinas as Rogelio Montero Báez 
 José Ron as Gustavo Durán Esquivel
 Susana González as Cynthia Montero Báez 
 Ana Brenda Contreras as Ana Paula Carmona Flores
 Ana Martín as María Gómez 
 Ana Bertha Espín as Rosaura Flores Nava
 Ingrid Martz as Daniela “Dani” Gutiérrez 
 Julián Gil as Bruno Rey
 Fabián Robles as Efraín Ríos
 Paty Díaz as Macaria de Hernández
 Osvaldo Benavides as Miguel Carmona Flores
 Mar Contreras as Vanessa Galván Villaseñor
 Alejandro Ávila as Ernesto Cortés
 Marco Méndez as Esteban 
 Michelle Ramaglia as Consuelo Herrera
 Anaís as Mercedes Durán Esquivel 
 Germán Gutiérrez as Ulises Hernández 
 Tania Lizardo as María de la Paz “Maripaz” Hernández
 Humberto Elizondo as Federico Galván
 Uriel del Toro as Hugo Dueñas 
 Juan Bernardo Flores as Margarito Montero Carmona/ Galván 
 Ignacio López Tarso as Fermín Peña 
 Jorge Aravena as David Romo
 Elizabeth Dupeyrón as Elsa Villaseñor de Galván
 Elena Torres as Roció “Chio”
 Javier Ruán as Don Maximo Pinos
 Aurora Clavel as Doña Milena
 Yolanda Ventura as Gloria de Cortéz 
 Polly as Elena 
 Mario del Río as Juan
 Marina Marín as Felipa Pérez 
 Zaneta Seilerova as Hilda
 Ricardo Mendoza "El Coyote" as Juan's friend
 Martín Brek as Juan's friend
 Rigoberto Carmona as Comandante
 Eduardo Liñan as Don Iván Montero
 Georgina Domínguez as Manuela
 Jorge Abraham as El Tuerto
 Martín Palomares as Rutilio

Reception
In the United States the series premiered with an average 4.1 million viewers. The finale averaged 5.8 million viewers.

Mexico ratings

Awards and nominations

References

External links 
 

Mexican telenovelas
Televisa telenovelas
Spanish-language telenovelas
Television shows set in Mexico
2011 telenovelas
2011 Mexican television series debuts
2012 Mexican television series endings